"Breathe" is a 2008 pop-dance song by Kaz James featuring Stu Stone. It is the first solo release by James, who is a former member of the group BodyRockers. The song was later included on James' debut album If They Knew, which was released in Australia and New Zealand in October 2008. The song peaked at No. 57 on the ARIA Singles Chart.

Music video
The music video for "Breathe" was directed by Australian filmmaker Fred Schepisi and cinematographer Ian Baker. The video was filmed in Melbourne, Australia.

Track listings
Australian CD single
"Breathe (Radio edit)" – 3:23
"Breathe (Original 12 Mix)" – 6:06
"Breathe (Thomas Gold Remix)" – 8:00
"Breathe (Nick Galea Remix)" – 7:55
"Breathe (Jason Herd Remix)" – 7:27

iTunes EP
6. "Breathe (Heat Remix)" – 5:14

Charts

Release history

References

2008 debut singles
Kaz James songs
2008 songs